The Critics' Choice Movie Award for Best Supporting Actor is one of the awards given by the Broadcast Film Critics Association at their annual Critics' Choice Movie Awards for a performance in a motion picture. It was first presented in 1995 with the winners being a tie between Ed Harris for Apollo 13 and Kevin Spacey for The Usual Suspects. There were no official nominees until 2001, currently six nominees are usually presented. 

Mahershala Ali is the only actor who has received this award more than once, with two wins. Philip Seymour Hoffman and Mark Ruffalo hold the record of most nominations in the category with three each.

Winners and nominees

1990s

2000s

2010s

2020s

Multiple nominees

2 nominations
 Mahershala Ali
 Alan Arkin
 Javier Bardem
 Josh Brolin
 Willem Dafoe
 Paul Dano
 Anthony Hopkins
 Jared Leto
 Alfred Molina
 Sam Rockwell
 J. K. Simmons
 Michael Shannon

3 nominations
 Philip Seymour Hoffman
 Mark Ruffalo

Multiple winners
2 wins
 Mahershala Ali

See also
 Academy Award for Best Supporting Actor
 BAFTA Award for Best Actor in a Supporting Role
 Independent Spirit Award for Best Supporting Male
 Golden Globe Award for Best Supporting Actor – Motion Picture
 Screen Actors Guild Award for Outstanding Performance by a Male Actor in a Supporting Role

References

External links
 Critics' Choice Movie Awards (official site)

A
Film awards for supporting actor